Crypteronia elegans is a species of flowering trees in the family Crypteroniaceae. It is found in Borneo (Sarawak).

References

External links
 Crypteronia elegans at Biolib

Crypteroniaceae
Plants described in 1995
Flora of Sarawak